Opatovce is a village and municipality in Trenčín District in the Trenčín Region of northwestern Slovakia.

History
The earliest surviving mention of the village in historical records dates to 1113.

In 1956 Opatove was voted Slovakia's best village in Slovakia's best village competition.

Geography
It has a population of about 395 people.

External links
https://www.webcitation.org/5QjNYnAux?url=http://www.statistics.sk/mosmis/eng/run.html

Villages and municipalities in Trenčín District